Tina Marie Bell (February 5, 1957 –  October 10, 2012) was an American singer, songwriter and front woman of the Seattle-based band Bam Bam. The band with Bell was considered one of the founders of the grunge music scene. Bell is considered an early grunge pioneer and dubbed as "the Godmother of Grunge" and "queen of Grunge".

Early life
Bell was born and raised in Seattle, Washington. She was the third of 10 siblings and the oldest daughter. She got her start as a singer by singing at the Mount Zion Baptist Church in Seattle, and her first experience on stage was performing with the Langston Hughes Theater, also in Seattle.

When looking for a French tutor so that she could sing French lyrics in a Langston Hughes Theater production, she met guitarist Tommy Martin. Bell eventually married Martin, and on September 7, 1979, the couple had a son, TJ Martin, who, in 2012, won the Academy Award for Best Documentary Feature for the film Undefeated.

Music career
Bell and Martin formed a band called Bam Bam in 1983. The band also included bassist Scott Ledgerwood, and drummer Matt Cameron (the latter went on to join Soundgarden and then Pearl Jam). Cameron was later replaced by Tom Hendrickson. Bell's diminutive frame of 5'2" belied her low smoky voice that was called "unapologetic".

According to Seattle Times: "The legacy of Bell, a Black woman, has often been overlooked in a genre typically associated with long-haired white guys." These include Seattle breakout bands like Nirvana, Pearl Jam, Alice in Chains, Soundgarden, and others of that ilk. She was sometimes the victim of racial attacks while on stage, but the Bell-led Bam Bam was popular with local audiences. Future Nirvana founder Kurt Cobain once served as a roadie for the band and was also a fan.

Although Bam Bam were courted by punk rock label C/Z Records, they opted instead to independently release their EP Villains (Also Wear White) in 1984. This was the first grunge record made at Reciprocal Recording studio, the location where later Nirvana made their demos for the Bleach and Incesticide albums. Villains predated the better known grunge recordings by about a year. "It wasn't for more than $100. The first band I recorded that released any kind of vinyl was an outfit called Bam Bam," Reciprocal Recording's owner Chris Hanzsek (the latter producer of albums by Soundgarden, Mudhoney, Melvins, and others in the Seattle music scene) told Billboard magazine. With songs written by Bell, Ledgerwood and Martin, and with Hendrickson on drums, Bam Bam recorded an album's worth of material at Reciprocal Recordings, including the material on the EP. Eight more of the tracks from the Reciprocal sessions were remastered and released in June 2019 as Free Fall From Space, produced by Martin and Hanzsek. An expanded version of Villains (Also Wear White) was released in late 2021 on Bric-a-Brac Records.

Later that year, Bam Bam released the album Bam Bam House Demo '84, which included earlier home recordings of some of the songs recorded at Reciprocal Recording. The band also released a video of the song "Ground Zero," written by Bell, Martin, Ledgerwood and Cameron and taken from the Reciprocal sessions. The song contains lyrics written by Bell about the threat of nuclear war, inspired by living near the Naval Submarine Base Bangor, a home port for Trident nuclear submarines.

After the mid 80's, both Ledgerwood and Hendrickson left the band, but Bell continued to front the band with a new rhythm section, along with Martin on guitar. In the late 80's and early 90's, Bam Bam performed in concerts with popular bands such as Pearl Jam, Soundgarden and Alice in Chains.

After not receiving the local recognition of the other emerging "Seattle Sound" bands, Bell and the band left Seattle for London in the late '80s, hoping for success in Europe. This, unfortunately, did not garner the intended recognition and resulted in deportation back to America during an immigration enforcement dragnet in the Netherlands.

Bell left Bam Bam in 1990, and eventually quit music entirely. Bam Bam chose not to replace her, and instead continued as a 3-piece instrumental band.

After her personal split from Martin, Bell filed for divorce on April 12, 1996. She eventually moved into assisted living and was an occasional volunteer at a local church. A planned reunion of the original Bam Bam members was cut short in 2012 with the passing of Bell. Bam Bam bassist Scott Ledgerwood has stated in interviews that he and Bell had started to write new music together before her death.

Death
Bell died in her Las Vegas apartment of cirrhosis of the liver at age 55 on October 10, 2012. Bell had struggled with alcohol and depression. Her son TJ Martin said the coroner estimated her time of death as a couple weeks before her body was found. When Martin arrived at his mother's apartment in Las Vegas, all of her belongings — except for a DVD player, a poster, and a chair — had been thrown away. All of her writings such as lyrics, poems, diaries, along with Bam Bam music, videos, and other memorabilia went in the trash without her family even being notified.

Legacy
Bell is considered an early grunge pioneer and is dubbed "the Godmother of Grunge" and "queen of Grunge".

Seattle musician Om Johari, who used to go to Bam Bam shows as a teenager and said she was inspired to see a fellow Black woman singing in the Seattle hard-rock scene, which wasn't always inclusive of Black people or women, said that Bell doesn't receive the recognition she deserves as one of the founders of grunge because of sexism and racism. A sentiment shared by Bell's former bandmate, Bam Bam bassist Scott Ledgerwood, who said that Bell didn't get the record deals and fame that some of her white male counterparts achieved in the grunge scene because people in power in the music industry didn't give her the chance. "They were too blind to see that America was ready for a Black superstar, a gorgeous lady, up front in a hard [rock] band", he said.

Tribute
On July 9, 2021, Seattle musicians formed a tribute band and played a show at Central Saloon to honor Bell's legacy. Om Johari, singer for Bad Brains tribute band Re-Ignition, had the idea for the show after CBS News' Gayle King contacted her to do a story on Bell. The Bam Bam tribute band included musicians such as Matt Cameron, guitarist Kendall Jones of Fishbone, guitarist Ayron Jones, and bassist Jenelle Roccaforte. Pearl Jam guitarist Stone Gossard also participated, as did black women Johari selected who were influenced by Bell's music. This included Eva Walker of The Black Tones, Shaina Shepherd of BEARAXE, Dmitra Smith of Ex's With Benefits and Dejha Colantuono, songwriter. The band played a selection of Bam Bam songs at the show. CBS followed up on Bell's legacy, with a packaged story by Lee Cowan on the first broadcast of CBS Mornings.

Discography
With Bam Bam
 Villains (Also Wear White) (1984) (EP)
 Free Fall From Space (2019) (EP)
 Villains (Also Wear White) (extended version) (2021) (EP)

References

1957 births
2012 deaths
African-American women singer-songwriters
African-American rock singers
Grunge musicians
American women singer-songwriters
Musicians from Seattle
20th-century African-American people
21st-century African-American people
20th-century African-American women
21st-century African-American women
Deaths from cirrhosis
Singer-songwriters from Washington (state)
Women punk rock singers
Women in punk